Amanite may refer to:

 Amanita, a genus which contains about 600 species of agarics.
 Amanita Design, a Czech independent video game developing company.
 An Amanullah loyalist, someone who supported the restoration of Amanullah Khan as king of Afghanistan.